The Rio Pro 2015 was an event of the Association of Surfing Professionals for 2015 ASP World Tour.

This event was held from 11 to 22 May at Rio de Janeiro, (Rio de Janeiro, Brazil) and opposed by 18 surfers.

The tournament was won by C.Conlogue (USA), who beat B. Buitendag (ZAF) in final.

Round 1

Round 2

Round 3

Round 4

Quarter finals

Semi finals

Final

References

Rio Pro
2015 World Surf League
International sports competitions in Rio de Janeiro (city)
2015 in Brazilian sport
Sports competitions in Rio de Janeiro (city)
Surfing in Brazil
2015 in Brazilian women's sport
Women's surfing